The XLR-129 was an American rocket engine design that would have used liquid hydrogen and liquid oxygen propellants. It was developed by Pratt & Whitney and initially was to develop  of thrust. It featured an expanding nozzle in order to tune performance over a wide range of altitudes.

The XLR-129 was designed to be reusable and was initially paid for by the US Air Force, for a 1960s program called ISINGLASS, which was to be a manned rocket plane that was intended for surveillance overflights.

The XLR-129 program was never completed, no complete engine was ever produced, but many systems were developed and tested.

References

Aircraft rocket engines
Rocket engines using hydrogen propellant